Boyd Franklin Morgan (October 24, 1915 – January 8, 1988) was an American football running back in the National Football League for the Washington Redskins.  He played college football at the University of Southern California and was drafted in the 18th round of the 1939 NFL Draft.

After World War II service as a Naval pilot, he became a prolific stuntman and actor in Hollywood.

Selected filmography
Smoky Canyon (1952)
Laramie Mountains (1952)
The Last Musketeer (1952)
Beyond the Time Barrier (1960) - Captain
The War Wagon (1967)
The Stalking Moon (1968) - Stage Driver Shelby
Support Your Local Sheriff! (1969) - Street Brawler (uncredited)
True Grit (1969) - Red - Ferryman (uncredited)
Alex in Wonderland (1970) - Photographer on Set (uncredited)
Gunsmoke (1970-1972)
 "Captain Sligo" (S16E16) - Tanner
 "My Brother's Keeper" (S17E10) - Kroll
 "The River" (S18E1-E2) - Suggs
The Cheyenne Social Club (1970) - Hansen
There Was a Crooked Man... (1970) - Hobbs (uncredited)
Rio Lobo (1970) - Train Engineer (uncredited)
Zabriskie Point (1970) - Policeman (uncredited)
Wild Rovers (1971) - Sheepman
Santee (1973) - Stagecoach Driver
Blazing Saddles (1974) - Outlaw #3 (uncredited)
Foxy Brown (1974) - Slauson
Gone with the West (1974) - Mimmo's Men
Evil Town (1977) - Vernon Patterson

References

External links
 

1915 births
1988 deaths
20th-century American male actors
American male film actors
American football running backs
United States Navy pilots of World War II
USC Trojans football players
Washington Redskins players
People from Comanche, Oklahoma